Kill Keith is a 2011 British comedy horror film starring Susannah Fielding, Marc Pickering, David Easter and Keith Chegwin.

Cast
 Chris Trott as Camera Guy - Extra 
 Susannah Fielding as Dawn
 Marc Pickering as Danny
 David Easter as Cliff
 Simon Phillips as Andy
 Keith Chegwin as himself
 Joe Tracini as Tony Blackburn
 Russell Grant as himself
 Tony Blackburn as himself

References

http://danielhg.blogspot.com/2010/08/kill-keith-filming-awaits.html
http://www.chortle.co.uk/news/2010/07/23/11419/kill_keith_chegwin!?rss
http://titanmagazinesus.com/news/5493-vanessa-feltz-and-keith-chegwin-to-meet-grizzly-end-in-kill-keith
https://actors.mandy.com/uk/film_view.php?uid=33479

External links
 
 

2011 films
2011 comedy horror films
2011 horror films
British comedy horror films
British independent films
2011 comedy films
2010s English-language films
2010s British films